The 7th Crunchyroll Anime Awards was held on March 4, 2023, at the Main Banquet Hall of the Grand Prince Hotel New Takanawa in Tokyo, Japan. It was the first ceremony to be held in person since 2020; both ceremonies in 2021 and 2022 were held virtually. Additionally, it was the first ceremony to be held in Japan, as previous physical ceremonies were held in the United States. Anime released on television  or online in Japan from November 2021 to September 2022 were eligible for nominations for this edition. The ceremony was hosted by voice actress Sally Amaki and presenter Jon Kabira, with Sony CEO Kenichiro Yoshida opening the show. Previous winners ALI and AKLO, Yuki Kajiura, and Kohta Yamamoto performed at the ceremony, while singer Haruka Kaki of Nogizaka46, comedian Kendo Kobayashi, entertainer Roland, and actress Sawa Suzuki presented the awards to the winners together with various voice actors and entertainers. Sony Music Solutions collaborated with Crunchyroll in planning and operations, with Telescope Inc. administering the voting process. Crunchyroll streamed the ceremony live on YouTube and Twitch, as well as on SonyLIV in India. Voting for the Anime of the Year category included "social voting" for the first time, which allowed Twitter users to vote for the category by posting the necessary hashtags or by retweeting. The list of nominees were announced on the first day of voting, January 19. Voting closed on January 25.

Crunchyroll announced the judges and categories on December 8, 2022. This edition featured 31 categories, and was divided into "main categories" and "fan categories". The winners for the main categories were announced physically, while winners for the fan categories were announced via a global livestream event that was held prior. New categories were introduced: "Must Protect at All Cost" Character, Best Original Anime, Presenter's Choice, Best Anime Song, Best Supporting Character, and Best New Series. Best Continuing Series was reinstated after being absent since 2019. Best Main Character and Best Supporting  Character replaced Best Main Character, Best Boy, and Best Girl categories. A Special Achievement Award was introduced after it was not awarded in the previous editions, but has yet to be given. Presenter's Choice was also introduced, which has not yet been given by a "special guest" to an "honored contributor" of their choice. Two new languages, Arabic and Italian, were included in the Best Voice Actor Performance, but Russian was dropped. The awards for Best Girl, Best Boy, Best Antagonist, and Best Fight Scene were dropped.

Spy × Family garnered the most nominations with 19, followed by Ranking of Kings (17 nominations) and Cyberpunk: Edgerunners (13 nominations). The three anime series were nominated for Anime of the Year, together with Attack on Titan: The Final Season Part 2,  Demon Slayer: Kimetsu no Yaiba Entertainment District Arc, and Lycoris Recoil. All Anime of the Year nominees, except Lycoris Recoil, were also nominated on the Best Animation category, together with Akebi's Sailor Uniform. Commercially successful films Dragon Ball Super: Super Hero and Jujutsu Kaisen 0 were nominated in the Best Film category, together with Bubble, The Deer King, and Annie Awards nominee Inu-Oh.

Cyberpunk: Edgerunners won Anime of the Year, becoming the first video game adaptation and prequel series to win, as well as Zach Aguilar who also won the Best VA Performance (English) award for his work as David Martinez. Demon Slayer: Kimetsu no Yaiba Entertainment District Arc, Attack on Titan: The Final Season Part 2, and Spy × Family are tied for the most wins with six. The film Jujutsu Kaisen 0 won three awards, including the Best Film category. Eren Jaeger from Attack on Titan won Best Main Character, while Anya Forger from Spy × Family won Best Supporting Character and "Must Protect At All Costs" Character. Haruo Sotozaki, director of Demon Slayer: Kimetsu no Yaiba Entertainment District Arc, won Best Director. "The Rumbling" won Best Opening Sequence and Best Anime Song, while "Comedy" won Best Ending Sequence. Yuki Kaji won Best VA Performance (Japanese) for two consecutive years. Amal Hawija and Elisa Giorgio won the inaugural Best VA Performance for Arabic and Italian, respectively. Demon Slayer: Kimetsu no Yaiba Entertainment District Arc won Best Action and Best Fantasy, Spy × Family won Best Comedy, Attack on Titan: The Final Season Part 2 won Best Drama, and Kaguya-sama: Love Is War – Ultra Romantic won Best Romance.

Winners and nominees

Statistics

References 

Crunchyroll
2023 awards
March 2023 events in Japan